Chel White (born May 30, 1959) is an American film director, composer, screenwriter and visual effects artist. In his independent films and music videos, White is known for his stylized, often experimental use of images, unusual animation and narratives depicting an outsider's perspective. He often adopts darkly humorous and poetic sensibilities to explore topics of love, obsession and alienation; with dreams and the subconscious being his greatest influences. He describes his own work as “stories and images that reside on the brink of dreams, or linger on the periphery of distorted memories.” A Rockefeller Fellow, Chel White has made three films based on the work of Peabody Award-winning writer and radio personality Joe Frank (Dirt, Soulmate, and Magda).

Chale Nafus of the Austin Film Society says, "I have been amazed at the stylistic and thematic diversity in (Chel White’s) films. Surreal, ethereal, wistful, and witty, I just allow my imagination to be taken into his complex, mysterious worlds.” The Austin Chronicle says, "(Chel White's) work seems to dispatch itself in some secret, subversive code, flashing messages amid animation, obscure stock footage, and actors with crazy eyes." 

Chel White has directed music videos for Radiohead's lead singer Thom Yorke, The Melvins, Tom Brosseau, Chrystabell & David Lynch, and collaborated with the Oregon Symphony. He has worked extensively with film director Gus Van Sant, creating visual effects on several of Van Sant's projects. White began directing commercials in 1992, and directing television programs in 1999, including two parodies for Saturday Night Live. Along with Ray Di Carlo and David Daniels, Chel White is a co-founder of the international production company Bent Image Lab in Portland, Oregon.

Early life and education 
Chel White was born in Kansas City, Missouri and grew up in Colorado, Michigan, Stockholm, and Evanston, Illinois where his father was a Northwestern University professor and his mother a schoolteacher. White cites his earliest influence as being the Surrealist paintings he was exposed to in grade school when visiting the Art Institute of Chicago. He began making films in high school where, studying under instructors Peter Kingsbury and Kevin Dole, he was introduced to the films of Norman McLaren, Harry Everett Smith, Bruce Connor, Maya Deren, Kenneth Anger, Len Lye and Jean Cocteau. White recalls, "When I was 16, I realized animation was the bridge between being an artist and a filmmaker. At that point I never looked back." In 1984, he received a Bachelor of Arts degree in Visual Arts, with a central focus on experimental film, from Antioch College in Yellow Springs, Ohio.

Independent filmmaker 
Chel White began making independent short films after college, starting with a drawn-on-film animation titled Metal Dogs of India (1985). In 1991, White completed  Choreography for Copy Machine (Photocopy Cha Cha), an animated film created solely by using the unique photographic capabilities of a photocopier to generate sequential pictures of hands, faces, and other body parts.  The film is widely considered the first noteworthy animated film using this technique. The Washington Post describes it as “(a) musical frolic which wittily builds on ghostly, distorted images crossing the plate glass of a copier.”  	
The films that followed include Dirt (1998), Soulmate (2000), Passage (2001), Magda (2004), A Painful Glimpse Into My Writing Process in Less Than 60 Seconds (2005), Wind (2007), a Donald Trump horror film parody called Little Donnie (2017), and Dreams of a Fallen Astronaut (2020) part of the Gratzfilm omnibus The One Minute Memoir.

In 2002, as a poetic response to the tragedies of September 11, Chel White created New York to be part of the omnibus collection Underground Zero. The Chicago Tribune called White's film "an eerie paean to the city itself," and Bill Stamets of the Chicago Reader said, “Chel White’s New York makes a ruined city enchanted again: jets ascend in twilight, framed by silhouetted rooftops and cranes, and droplets sparkle like tiny diamonds as kids delight in the spray of fire hydrants."

White's 2007 short film, Wind, was commissioned by Radiohead’s creative director Dilly Gent and the climate change awareness group Live Earth. The New York Times Magazine describes it as “(a) beautiful film, very moving, set to a poem by Antonio Machado and narrated by Alec Baldwin.” Using a Robert Bly translation of the poem, Wind creates a metaphor for humanity's lack of planet stewardship. Along with eight other Live Earth commissioned films, "Wind" made its world premiere in the opening night program of the 2007 Tribeca Film Festival with keynote speaker Al Gore.

The films of Chel White have screened in the Sundance Film Festival, Berlinale, IFFR, SXSW, Ottawa International Animation Festival, Annecy Festival, Hiroshima International Animation Festival, HKIFF, SIFF, and the Edinburgh International Film Festival. 2012 saw the release of Bucksville, Chel White‘s directorial feature film debut. Written and produced well before the Occupation of the Malheur National Wildlife Refuge and the 2016 Trump presidential election, the film is a story about a young man who tries to sever ties to a disenfranchised, small town radical militia started by his father. Distributed by Phase 4 Films, Bucksville stars Thomas Stroppel, Ted Rooney and Allen Nause, with a cameo role by Academy Award Nominated actor Tom Berenger as The Patron of Justice. Along with Pulitzer Prize winning photographer David Hume Kennerly, Berenger is also an executive producer on the film. The screenplay is by Laura McGie and Chel White, with music by Tom Brosseau. Jamie S. Rich of The Oregonian calls Bucksville, “An insightful portrayal of an extreme point of view without the expected self-righteous critique.”

White's museum screenings include the Van Gogh Museum, The Brooklyn Museum, The Museum of Fine Arts, Boston and The High Museum in Atlanta. His retrospective presentations include the Ann Arbor Film Festival (1999 and 2002), Southern Circuit (2002), the Austin Film Society (2003), a 20-year career retrospective at the Northwest Film Center (Portland Art Museum) (2012), and a Bent Image Lab retrospective and masterclass at the Ottawa International Animation Festival (2018). Chel White is the recipient of media arts Fellowships from The Rockefeller Foundation The Regional Arts & Culture Council, Portland Oregon, and project grants from Creative Capital, the Pacific Pioneer Fund and the Oregon Arts Commission. Fever Dreams and Heavenly Nightmares, a DVD compilation of Chel White's short independent films, was released in 2006 by Microcinema International.

Professional career 
Chel White started his professional career in 1986, working as an animator for film director Jim Blashfield on music videos for Paul Simon, Tears for Fears and Michael Jackson. In 1991, he began creating visual effects for director Gus Van Sant, starting with My Own Private Idaho (1991). White went on to be visual effects supervisor on Van Sant's Even Cowgirls Get The Blues (1993), Paranoid Park (2007), Milk (2008) and Restless (2011), as well as title effects supervisor on director Todd Haynes' film, I'm Not There, and the animation sequences in David Oyelowo's feature film, The Water Man (2020).

White directed two shorts for NBC's Saturday Night Live and Robert Smigel's Saturday TV Funhouse, The Narrator That Ruined Christmas (season 27, episode 9) and Blue Christmas (season 30, episode 8). Both are parodies of the Rudolph the Red-Nosed Reindeer television special (1964). Airing first on December 15, 2001, The Narrator That Ruined Christmas was written by Robert Smigel, Michael Gordon, Louis CK and Stephen Colbert, with the voices of Chris Parnell, Maya Rudolph, Amy Poehler, Doug Dale, and Robert Smigel. Airing first on December 18, 2004, Blue Christmas was written by Robert Smigel and Michelle Saks Smigel with additional material by Rich Blomquist, Stephen Colbert, Scott Jacobson, and Matt O'Brien, and voices by Maya Rudolph, Amy Poehler, Erik Bergmann, and Robert Smigel. The success of the SNL shorts led to other holiday themed stop motion projects that White would direct through Bent Image Lab, including two children's television specials for Hallmark Channel. In reviewing the 2011 television holiday programs, Mike Hale of The New York Times called Jingle All the Way (TV special)  "By far the best of the bunch. In addition to its charming art and pleasantly low-key storytelling, 'Jingle' stands apart from the other holiday programs by not focusing on the manufacturing or delivery of toys."

In 2006, Chel White directed the music video for Thom Yorke's song Harrowdown Hill (Best Music Video, 2007 SXSW). Along with his team and co-founders at Bent Image Lab, he pioneered the Smallgantics technique that was used for the first time in the Harrowdown Hill video. In 2012, White directed a video for Chrysta Bell & David Lynch to the song Bird of Flames from the album This Train. It has been described as "a haunting and surreal vision."

The commercials Chel White directed have been honored with Clio Awards, a D&AD Award, a The One Club Award, two Association of Independent Commercial Producers (AICP) Awards, and two are included in the permanent collection of the Museum of Modern Art in New York. His personal favorite ads he directed are for the Washington State Department of Health in a campaign of surreal anti-smoking public service announcements aimed at children.

Chel White's composer credits include Joan C. Gratz's Academy Award winning animated short film Mona Lisa Descending a Staircase, Joanna Priestley and Joan C. Gratz's animated short Pro and Con,  Choreography for Copy Machine and the feature film Bucksville. From 1981-82, he was a member of the techno duo Process Blue (Dark Entries Records). 2019 saw the release of "Automaton", a vinyl record of White's experimental and soundtrack music from between 1985 to 1991 (Platform 23 Recordings). White's screenwriting credits include Bucksville (feature), Little Donnie (short), story development for Jingle All the Way (TV special), and the story adaptation based on the original Rudolph the Red-Nosed Reindeer for the SimEx-Iwerks 4D attraction film of the same title.As an actor, Chel White had a role in Even Cowgirls Get the Blues (1993), playing a brain surgeon in a scene with Uma Thurman.

Personal life
In December 2005, White and his then-girlfriend Laura Ivey were stranded in a mountain snowstorm for four days in the Cascade Mountains, Oregon. They were found by Marion County, Oregon Search and Rescue officers who traveled to the remote location by snowmobile.

Since 1985, Chel White has lived in Portland, Oregon.

Filmography

Compilations and feature-length film 
The Retention Department of Perpetual Exhaustion, segment: Mr. French's Secret (2022)
The One Minute Memoir, segment: Dreams of a Fallen Astronaut (2020)
Filmmakers Unite (FU), Little Donnie (2017)
Bucksville (2012)
The Animation Show, Magda (2007)
Fever Dreams and Heavenly Nightmares: The Short Films of Chel White (2006)
Underground Zero: Part II, segment: New York (2002)
23rd Tournee of Animation, Choreography for Copy Machine (Photocopy Cha Cha) (1991)

Short films 
My One Minute Memoir: Dreams of a Fallen Astronaut (2020)
Little Donnie (2017)
Wind (2007)
A Painful Glimpse Into My Writing Process (In Less Than 60 Seconds) (2005)
Magda (2004)
Eclipse (2003)
New York (2002)
Passage (2001)
Soulmate (2000)
The Beats, the Bomb and the 1950s: Robert Briggs (1999)
Dirt (1998)
Choreography for Copy Machine (Photocopy Cha Cha) (1991)
Machine Song (1987)
Metal Dogs of India (1985)

Videography 
Dean Hurley - No More (2022)
Tom Brosseau - Tami (2014)
Chrysta Bell and David Lynch - Bird of Flames (2012)
Thom Yorke - Harrowdown Hill (2006)
Season to Risk - Blood Ugly (1994)
Melvins - Hooch (1993)
Candlebox - Change (1992)

Television
Jingle All the Way (TV special) (2011)
Saturday Night Live / Saturday TV Funhouse Blue Christmas (a.k.a. "Santa and the States)" (2004)
Saturday Night Live / Saturday TV Funhouse The Narrator Who Ruined Christmas (2001)
The PJs / Ghetto Superstars (2000)

Commercials and Public Service Announcements 
American Indian College Fund - One Percent (2015)
Lux (soap) - Provocateur (2006)
Washington State Department of Health - Park and Rec Room (2005)
OfficeMax - Santa's Helper (2005)
Reese's Pieces - Center of Attention (2003) (co-directed with David Daniels)
Fila - Mash (1994)
Memorial Blood Centers - Photocopy Jazz (1992)

Appearances
Live Wire Radio, Episode #198, interviewee (November 12, 2012)
Art In Context, PBS / KLRU, interviewee (March 15, 2010)
The American Avant Garde, interviewee (2004)
Exposure, The Sci-Fi Channel (SyFy), interviewee (2000)
Oregon Art Beat, Season 2 Episode #219, interviewee (April 5, 2000)
Even Cowgirls Get The Blues, acting role as brain surgeon (1993)

Other media
Animation Sketchbooks, book, featured artist, Chronicle Books LLC, by Laura Heit (2013)
Animation in Process, book, featured artist, London: Laurence King, by Andrew Selby  (2009)

Fellowships, grants and awards 
2008: Oregon Arts Commission, Project Grant, feature film development, Stranded.
2007: Rockefeller Foundation, Media Artist Fellowship, feature film development, Stranded.
2007: SXSW, Best Music Video, Thom Yorke, Harrowdown Hill.
2006: The AICP Show at MoMA, Office Max Santa's Helper, included in The Art and Technique of the American Television Commercial, permanent collection, Museum of Modern Art New York. 
2006: Bend Film Festival, Best Short Film, A Painful Glimpse Into My Writing Process (In Less Than 60 Seconds)
2005: Regional Arts & Culture Council, Media Artist Fellowship, feature film development.
2005: Ann Arbor Film Festival, EMPA Work Life Award, Magda.
2004: Florida Film Festival, Grand Jury Award for Best Animated Short, Magda. 
2001: Creative Capital, feature film screenplay development, Path of Bees.
1998: Stockholm International Film Festival, Best Short Film, Dirt.
1994: The AICP Show at MoMA, Fila Mash, included in the program The Art and Technique of the American Television Commercial, permanent collection, Museum of Modern Art New York. 
1992: Ann Arbor Film Festival, Best Animated Film, Choreography for Copy Machine (Photocopy Cha Cha).
1991: Chicago International Film Festival, Nominated for Best Short Film, Winner Gold Plaque for Animation, Choreography for Copy Machine (Photocopy Cha Cha).

See also
Joe Frank
David Lynch
Gus Van Sant
Thom Yorke
David Oyelowo
Joan C. Gratz
Norman McLaren

References

External links
 
 
 Bent Image Lab
 Animation Show

Stop motion animators
Living people
American film directors
American animated film directors
American animated film producers
American animators
American music video directors
American male screenwriters
1959 births